The Celsius family descended from the vicar of Ovanåker parish in Gävleborg County, Sweden, Nicolaus Magni Travillagæus, later Alptaneus (1577–1658). His son, the mathematician and astronomer Magnus Celsius, took the name Celsius which was the Latinized form of his father's vicarage and his childhood home.

A branch of the family was ennobled on 9 November 1756, with the name von Celse, Olof Celsius the Elder's children. The von Celse branch of the family became extinct in 1838, with the death of Lieutenant-Colonel Olof von Celse.

Notable Celsius family members 

 Magnus Celsius  (1621–1679)
 Nils Celsius (1658–1724)
 Johan Celsius (1660–1710)
 Olof Celsius (1670–1756),
 Anders Celsius (1701–1744)	
 Olof Celsius the Younger (1716–1794)

Swedish families
Latin-language surnames